This list shows all programs broadcast on Syfy Universal in France:

 Les 100
 12 Monkeys
 ALF
 American Gothic
 Au-delà du réel
 Battlestar Galactica
 Blade
 Caprica
 Code Quantum
 Continuum
 Dark Matter
 Les Décalés du cosmos
 Défiance
 Destination Vérité
 Dominion
 Farscape
 Flash Gordon
 Grimm
 Haven
 Helix
 Hercule
 Heroes
 Heroes Reborn
 Heroes of Cosplay
 Killjoys
 Les Chroniques de Shannara
 The Librarians
 Merlin
 Painkiller Jane
 Les Portes du temps
 Psi Factor, chroniques du paranormal
 Rick and Morty
 Sanctuary
 SeaQuest, police des mers
 Sliders : Les Mondes parallèles
 Star Trek
 Surface
 Torchwood
 Tremors
 Troisième planète après le Soleil
 Xena, la guerrière

Syfy Universal (France)
Syfy (French TV channel)